John Newland (fl. 1384–1386) of Grimsby, Lincolnshire, was an English politician.

He was a Member (MP) of the Parliament of England for Great Grimsby in April 1384, November 1384 and 1386.

References

Year of birth missing
Year of death missing
English MPs April 1384
Members of the Parliament of England for Great Grimsby
English MPs November 1384
English MPs 1386